Tre metri sopra il cielo (Three steps over heaven) is a 2004 film, directed by Luca Lucini, based on the novel by Federico Moccia. It was released in cinemas in Italy on 12 March 2004.

Plot 
Rome. Stefano Mancini, called "Step" (Riccardo Scamarcio), and Roberta Gervasi, called "Babi" (Katy Saunders), belong to two completely different realities. She is a model student, has friends and courtiers and is divided between home, school, and private elite housewives. He is a hard-pasted teppist and troubled family relationships (especially with his mother) who spends his time in clandestine races in motion and scorribande. Fate will bring them to meet and fall in love, though Babi is the only witness to Step's aggression to a poor man who has split his glasses with a head and intends to testify against the boy. Their story takes off according to the logical banal of alchemy between opposites and the opposition of her parents. Babi is introduced to a world that is unknown to her, she begins to marinate the school, to study less and to get hurt in trouble, but it seems that nothing is able to divide it from Step. The two have never been in love before, but Step's violent and unscrupulous life will go back to Babi several times until, after the death of his great friend Pollo who had a story with Pallina, Babi best friend, she will decide to leave him permanently.

Curiosity 
Carmela Vincenti plays a teacher, a role she had already played (as imitation) in her debut film Compagni di scuola (School Companions).

The motorcycle used by Step in the film, is a Ghezzi-Brian Furia, a rare special author created on a Moto Guzzi engine. It is immediately recognizable by the characteristic two overlapping front headlights. When Babi sees for the first time the writing Io e te tre metri sopra il cielo (Me and you three steps over heaven), she is in the road that passes under Corso Francia in Rome.

The castle is located in the township of Santa Marinella.

Differences between the film and the novel 
The film has some substantial differences and omissionsfrom the novel.
 In the novel, Babi is described as a slim girl with large blue eyes and long blond hair. In the film, Babi is brown with brown eyes and, according to the writer Moccia, is too beautiful compared to the Babi of the book.
 Babi's father's car is in the book a Mercedes; in the movie is a Jaguar.
 In the novel Step, on his bike, notes Babi in the traffic and is so close to her car to ask her to do a ride together, but in the film the first meeting between the two takes place while he is sitting with Pollo on a bench and sees her passes in a car noticing it.
 In the novel, at the party, Step asks Chicco Brandelli to pour him a glass of Coca-Cola while he talk with Babi, while in the film it is a glass of Champagne.
 In the book, after Babi throws Coca-Cola's into the face of Step, he drags her into a bath in the villa and with the jet baths her completely in a shower, while in the movie it's a bathtub.
 In the book is explained that Step's footsteps are due to having discovered that the mother has a relationship with another man, while in the movie Step is less violent. 
 In the book Step competes for first in one of the greenhouse races and in the second race Babi is the groupie, but the race ends before the participants arrive at the finish line due to Babi's screams that stop the race after seeing a motorcyclist drops, while in the movie the two compete in the same race and Step wins.
 In the film it is only explained that Step attacks the mother's lover after finding them together, while in the novel this scene is described completely during the memories of the protagonist.
 In the movie the fight between Babi and Madda is completely different from the one told in the book.
 In the movie there are not references to the Brazilian Francesca who knows Claudio in a bar while he discussing with Step, while in the novel that content is inserted into the plot.
 In the novel the first time between Step and Babi takes place in an abandoned house, while in the movie takes place in a castle where Babi as a child dreamed of being a princess.
 In the film Step understands that having taken the necklace has been the Siciliano and comes to his home to resume it, while in the novel is not mentioned the place where he faces it. In addition, in the novel, the fight between Step and Siciliano takes place late in the evening, while in the film takes place in the afternoon. Finally, in the film, the fight between the two, is not shown, while in the novel it is described.
 In the novel is described a scene where Step, after Pollo's death, calls Babi's home asking if she's there, while in the movie this scene is absent.
 In the novel Paolo, Step's brother, does not admit that he also knew about his mother's cheat.

Awards 
 2005 - Nastro d'argento : nomination Best producer (Riccardo Tozzi, Giovanni Stabilini and Marco Chimenz)
 2004 - Globo d'oro : Best Actor Revelation at Riccardo Scamarcio

Soundtrack 
A CD of the movie soundtrack was released on 4 March 2004 in Italy.
Tracks 
 "Intro" (Dj Bu$)
 "Sere nere" (Tiziano Ferro)
 "Gabriel" (Lamb)
 "He's simple, he's dumb, he's the pilot" (Grandaddy)
 "Interludio #1" (Dj Bu$)
 "Radio caos" (De Luca & Forti) 
 "Can you do that?" (De Luca & Forti)
 "Your deepest dream" (De Luca & Forti)
 "Are you in love?" (De Luca & Forti)
 "Nina" (Comedy of life)
 "Centosessanta caratteri" (De Luca & Forti)
 "Interludio #2" (Dj Bu$)
 "Beyond your darkest dreaming" (De Luca & Forti)
 "By my side" (Comedy of life)
 "For the first time" (De Luca & Forti)
 "Faster than life" (De Luca & Forti)
 "Aqui otra vez" (Comedy of life)
 "Wheeling" (La menade)
 "Your hypnotic eyes" (De Luca & Forti)
 "02:12 Am" (De Luca & Forti)
 Il lungo addio (De Luca & Forti)
 "Outro" (Dj Bu$)
 "E se ne va" (Le Vibrazioni)
 "Nuts on Ya Chin" (Eazy-E)

Sequel 
On 9 March 2007, the sequel Ho voglia di te (English: I Want You) was released based on the book of the same title.

Remake 
In 2010, a Spanish remake of the film was made, Tres metros sobre el cielo, directed by Fernando González Molina and starring María Valverde, Mario Casas, Nerea Camacho and Diego Martín.

External links 
 

2000s romance films
Italian romantic drama films
Films directed by Luca Lucini
Warner Bros. films